Chennedy Carter (born November 14, 1998) is an American professional basketball player. She played college basketball for the Texas A&M Aggies. In April 2019, Carter was named an honorable mention All-American by the Associated Press.
Carter was chosen fourth overall in the 2020 WNBA Draft by the Atlanta Dream.

Texas A&M statistics
Source

Professional career
Since she turned 22 in 2020, she was eligible for the 2020 draft. On March 29, Chennedy Carter declared for the WNBA draft, forgoing her senior season. On April 17, she was drafted fourth overall in the 2020 WNBA Draft by the Atlanta Dream. She became the highest drafted player in Texas A&M history.

WNBA
In her rookie season, she became the youngest player in WNBA history to score 30 points at 21 years and 266 days when she put up 35 against Seattle (8/6). She was considered the top candidate for the WNBA Rookie of the Year award until she sustained an ankle injury in the team's loss to the Connecticut Sun. Carter was sidelined for six games. She returned to the court on August 30 and scored 26 points in 26 minutes against Los Angeles. She scored at least 25 points on four occasions, becoming the fourth first-year player to score 25+ points in a game for Atlanta. At the end of the season, Carter was named to the 2020 WNBA All-Rookie Team.

Overseas
She agreed terms with Elazığ İl Özel İdarespor for her first overseas season.

WNBA career statistics

Regular season

|-
| style="text-align:left;"| 2020
| style="text-align:left;"| Atlanta
| 16 || 16 || 25.4 || .473 || .375 || .821 || 2.3 || 3.4 || 0.9 || 0.3 || 2.7 || 17.4
|-
| style='text-align:left;'| 2021
| style='text-align:left;'| Atlanta
| 11 || 11 || 25.5 || .455 || .111 || .875 || 1.3 || 3.3 || 0.7 || 0.4 || 2.1 || 14.2
|-
| style='text-align:left;'| 2022
| style='text-align:left;'| Los Angeles
| 24 || 2 || 16.4 || .450 || .200 || .745 || 1.9 || 1.9 || 0.6 || 0.4 || 1.8 || 8.9
|-
| style='text-align:left;'| Career
| style='text-align:left;'| 3 years, 2 teams
| 51 || 29 || 21.2 || .461 || .294 || .809 || 1.9 || 2.7 || 0.7 || 0.4 || 2.1 || 12.7

References

External links
Texas A&M Aggies bio

1998 births
Living people
All-American college women's basketball players
American women's basketball players
Atlanta Dream draft picks
Atlanta Dream players
Los Angeles Sparks players
Basketball players at the 2019 Pan American Games
Basketball players from Texas
McDonald's High School All-Americans
Pan American Games medalists in basketball
Pan American Games silver medalists for the United States
People from Mansfield, Texas
Shooting guards
Texas A&M Aggies women's basketball players
Medalists at the 2019 Pan American Games
United States women's national basketball team players